Norwich City vs Luton Town was an FA Cup Fourth Round tie, played on 26 January 2013 at Carrow Road, Norwich. Luton won the match 1–0. This was the first time in the Premier League era that a top division side was beaten by a non-League team, and the first time since Altrincham beat Birmingham City at St. Andrew's in 1986 that this feat was achieved at the home of the top-flight team.  The last team to beat a top division side from the Conference was Sutton United when they beat Coventry City in 1989.  Luton became the seventh non-League team since World War II to reach the Fifth Round of the FA Cup.

Route to the Match

Norwich City

Luton Town

Match summary

Match Statistics

Source:

Match reports
 BBC
 ITV
 Luton Town
 Norwich City
 Sky
 The Guardian
 The Telegraph

References

2012–13 FA Cup
FA Cup matches
Luton 2013
Norwich 2013
January 2013 sports events in the United Kingdom